is a Japanese actor. His most prominent role has been as Takeshi Hongo in the film Kamen Rider The First and its sequel Kamen Rider The Next. He was also in Pretty Guardian Sailor Moon as Sailor Jupiter's love interest Motoki Furuhata, as well as the sequel to Battle Royale, Battle Royale 2: Requiem. He also was Yousuke the disc jockey in the movie Dear Friends, where he was reunited with Keiko Kitagawa. Furthermore, he was in the Japanese drama My Boss my Hero playing Sakaki Mikio, younger brother to the main character.

Filmography

Film
Tomie: Re-birth (2001) as Shun'ichi Hosoda
Battle Royale 2: Requiem (2003) as Shintaro Makimura
Kamen Rider The First (2005) as Takeshi Hongo
My Boss My Hero (2006) as Sakaki Mikio
Kamen Rider The Next (2007) as Takeshi Hongo
Dear Friends (2007) as Yousuke the disc jockey
Kyō Kara Hitman (2009) as Dual
Jossy's (2014)
Hakodate Coffee (2016) as Eiji
Leaving the Scene (2019)

Series
Toshiie and Matsu (2002) as Hosokawa Tadaoki
Pretty Guardian Sailor Moon (2004) as Motoki Furuhata
Tenchijin (2009) as Honda Masashige
Strangers 6 (2012)
Yae no Sakura (2013) as Tokio Yokoi
Ultraman X (2015) as Alien Gold "tE-rU"
Idol x Warrior Miracle Tunes! (2017) as Seitarō 
Kishiryu Sentai Ryusoulger (2019) as Master Red
Ultraman Decker (2022) as Taiji Murahoshi

References

External links
Official profile at Toyota Office 

Japanese male actors
1980 births
Living people